Institutoa is a railway station in Gernika, Basque Country, Spain. It is owned by Euskal Trenbide Sarea and operated by Euskotren. It lies on the Urdaibai line.

History 
The current station was built by FEVE (the operator of the line at the time) in 1969 to serve a high school in the area. A halt had been built in the same location in 1938 to serve a nearby hospital-prison.

Services 
The station is served by Euskotren Trena line E4. It runs every 30 minutes (in each direction) during weekdays, and every hour during weekends.

References 

Euskotren Trena stations
Railway stations in Biscay
Railway stations in Spain opened in 1938
Railway stations in Spain opened in 1969
1969 establishments in Spain